National Training Centre Poprad is a football stadium in Poprad, Slovakia. It serves as home stadium for football club FK Poprad and Slovak national football youth teams. NTC is also used by football teams for camps and international matches. The stadium has an all-seated capacity of 5,700.

Image gallery

References

External links 
 http://www.ntcpoprad.sk

Poprad
Sports venues completed in 2014
Sport in Poprad
Football venues in Slovakia
2014 establishments in Slovakia
Sport in Prešov Region